The 1973 Tour de Romandie was the 27th edition of the Tour de Romandie cycle race and was held from 8 May to 13 May 1973. The race started in Geneva and finished in Lancy. The race was won by Wilfried David.

General classification

References

1973
Tour de Romandie
Tour de Romandie
1973 Super Prestige Pernod